Büyükkavaklı is a village in the Adıyaman District, Adıyaman Province, Turkey. Its population is 916 (2021).

The hamlets of Karşıyaka and Küçükkavaklı are attached to the village.

References

Villages in Adıyaman District
Kurdish settlements in Adıyaman Province